Karina Labastida Sotelo (born 12 January 1976) is a Mexican politician affiliated with the MORENA. As of 2013, she served as Deputy of the LXII Legislature of the Mexican Congress representing the State of Mexico.

References

1976 births
Living people
Politicians from Mexico City
Women members of the Chamber of Deputies (Mexico)
National Action Party (Mexico) politicians
21st-century Mexican politicians
21st-century Mexican women politicians
Deputies of the LXII Legislature of Mexico
Members of the Chamber of Deputies (Mexico) for the State of Mexico